Catherine Winder is a Canadian digital media producer and executive.

Winder served as President of Rainmaker Entertainment from May 12, 2009 to June 30, 2012.

Winder is a native of Toronto, Ontario, Canada and began her film career in Japan, which she later said helped her in adopting anime and manga elements into the Clone Wars animation style.

Notes and references

External links

Meet the Producer and Director Of The Clone Wars at Celebration IV on StarWars.com
The Clone Wars  Video Profile: Catherine on StarWars.com

Film producers from Ontario
Living people
Year of birth missing (living people)
Canadian women film producers
People from Toronto